Governor Dawson may refer to:

John W. Dawson (1820–1877), Governor of Utah Territory
William M. O. Dawson (1853–1916), 12th Governor of West Virginia